Pseudoscaphiella is a genus of spiders in the family Oonopidae. It was first described in 1907 by Simon. , it contains only one species, Pseudoscaphiella parasita.

References

Oonopidae
Monotypic Araneomorphae genera
Spiders of Africa